Castleween (Spirits & Spells in North America) is the name of two 2002/2003 platform video games, one developed by Kalisto Entertainment for the PlayStation 2 and ported to the GameCube by Wanadoo Edition, and the other developed by Magic Pockets for the Game Boy Advance.

Gameplay

Plot
Alicia and Greg set off with their friends one Halloween night to look for a house in the forest where they could stock up on goodies. Upon reaching the house, Greg and Alicia's friends are turned into stone by a bogeyman. To save their friends, the two heroes must enter the world of the dead. In order to find their friends and set them free, they need to make it through cemeteries, haunted houses and sinister laboratories. Only one person at a time is allowed to enter the world of the dead, so Alicia and Greg must take turns in order to make their way through the danger that awaits them. Friends like the Goblin and Jack O'Lantern will teach them magic tricks that will help them to overcome obstacles along the way. They must find the Mad Scientist's laboratory to get their friends home safe and sound.

Characters
Alicia - a redheaded, blue-eyed little girl, dressed up as a witch for Halloween. She might seem quiet and polite at first, but she can be very mischievous and dynamic. She has got quite a personality.
Greg - a rather hard-headed boy. He is dressed as a devil for Halloween. He hates school, authority and anything that is not playing with his friends. He is quite wild and rowdy and he tends to break everything in his path - this kid is a little monster.

Reception

The Game Boy Advance and GameCube versions received "mixed" reviews according to the review aggregation website Metacritic. Nintendo Power gave the GBA version an average review, over two months before it was released Stateside.

References

External links
 
 

2002 video games
DreamCatcher Interactive games
Game Boy Advance games
GameCube games
Halloween video games
Magic Pockets games
Multiplayer and single-player video games
Platform games
PlayStation 2 games
Video games developed in France
Video games featuring female protagonists
MTO (video game company) games